CinEast (pronounced “Ciné East” [sine i:st]) or Central and Eastern European Film Festival is an annual non-profit film festival held at various venues around Luxembourg in October.

Festival

The CinEast film festival is dedicated to presenting the current film productions from countries of Central and Eastern Europe, part of what was formerly called the Eastern Bloc. Although focusing on the recent feature films, the festival equally presents the most remarkable documentaries, animated works and short films. Besides film projections, the festival also offers a rich programme of accompanying events, including concerts, exhibitions, debates and gastronomic evenings, as well as support to a charity project. CinEast is organised by the non-profit association CinEast asbl. Since 2010, the festival has also included an official competition.

History

Building on experience gained during Polish Film Days in 2006, the first edition of Central European Film Festival of Luxembourg held in October 2008 presented films from 4 countries (Czech Republic, Hungary, Poland and Slovakia) at the premises of the Abbaye de Neumünster in Luxembourg. 
In 2009, Luxembourg’s Cinémathèque became the second main festival venue and the festival grew in terms of both number of films and spectators. 
In 2010, the festival acquired the current name “CinEast” and expanded to numerous new venues, almost doubling in size. Romania became the next featured country and an official competition was introduced. 
For the 2011 edition, Bulgaria was added to the countries represented and around 80 projections and many accompanying events were offered, attracting over 7,000 participants. 
In 2012, CinEast opened its doors to Baltic countries (Estonia, Latvia, Lithuania) as well as Slovenia, Croatia and Serbia, thus featuring 12 countries in total. The cinematography of the rest of the ex-Yugoslavia countries has been represented at CinEast since 2013. The 7th edition of CinEast in 2014 presented over 55 feature and 45 short films from 18 countries and attracted 9,800 festival-goers. Ukraine and Moldova were represented for the first time. The 2014 International Jury was presided by Sergei Loznitsa, in 2015 by the late Andrzej Zulawski who had to cancel his visit due to health reasons. 
Since the 8th edition, the festival has been awarding a Critics Prize, chosen by a Press Jury. The 2015 edition attracted an audience of 9500 visitors with more than 50 feature films and 50 short productions. 
The 9th edition took place from 6 to 23 October 2016 and presented more than 60 long and 40 short films from 18 countries of the former Eastern Bloc and attracted more than 10,400 visitors to the screenings and events (musical, gastronomical, debates, photography exhibition). The International Festival Jury was presided by actress/director Mirjana Karanović. The 10th edition of the festival took place from 5 to 22 October 2017 and presented more than 100 films from 19 countries, the selection having been extended by films from Albania this year. The international jury was composed of the film director Anne Fontaine (president of the jury), actor Adrian Titieni, director and producer Bady Minck, producer Philippe Carcassonne and Oliver Baumgarten, the programme director of the Max-Ophüls Preis Festival. The Press Jury included Pablo Chimienti (Le Quotidien), Valerija Berdi (Radio 100,7) and Matthew Boas (Cineuropa.org). The 11th CinEast (4-21 October 2018) featured the "Identities" thematic cycle as well as a special Focus on Latvia and attracted over 10,400 festival-goers. The International Jury was presided over by the Hungarian director Benedek Fliegauf and included actors Arta Dobroshi and Astrid Roos, director Govinda Van Maele and producer/festival organiser Sergej Stanojkovski. The Press Jury comprised journalists Claude Neu, Charlotte Wensierski and Loïc Millot. 

The 12th CinEast (3-20 October 2019) welcomed over 11,200 people, setting a new attendance record, and presented 67 feature and around 50 short films. The edition featured a special Focus on Lithuania and the thematic cycle "Down with Walls". The International Jury was led by Jacques Doillon and included Renata Santoro, Marius Olteanu, Sophie Mousel and Adolf El Assal. The Press Jury was composed of Marc Trappendreher, Cristóbal Soage and France Clarinval. 
The 13th "hybrid" edition of CinEast (8-25 October 2020) was adapted to the Covid-19 restrictions, combining 110 screenings in cinemas (limited capacity) and on-line screenings, with a Focus on Hungary and the theme "Planting the Future". The International Jury members: Tomasz Wasilewski, Heleen Gerritsen, Jani Thiltges, Zoé Wittock & Boyd van Hoeij. Press Jury 2020: Yasemin Elçi, António Raúl Reis & Elena Lazic.

Current Edition
The 14th edition of CinEast took place from 7 to 24 October 2021.

Award winners

2021
 Grand Prix – Murina by Antoneta Alamat Kusijanović
 Special Jury Prize – Never Gonna Snow Again by Małgorzata Szumowska and Michał Englert
 Critics' Prize - Miracle by Bogdan George Apetri
 Young Talents Award - Love Tasting by Dawid Nickel
 Audience Award – Love Around The World by Davor Rostuhar & Andjela Rostuhar
 Audience Award for Best Short Fiction Film – Boredom by Alica Bednáriková
 Audience Award for Best Short Animated Film - Red Shoes by Anna Podskalská
 Audience Award for Best Short Documentary Film - Stolen Fish by Gosia Juszczak

2020
 Grand Prix – Servants by Ivan Ostrochovský
 Special Jury Prize – Mare by Andrea Štaka
 Critics' Prize - Stories from the Chestnut Woods by Gregor Božič
 Audience Award – Collective by Alexander Nanau
 Audience Award for Best Short Fiction Film – Lake of Happiness by Aliaksei Paluyan
 Audience Award for Best Short Animated Film - Way of Silvie by Verica Pospíšilová Kordić
 Audience Award for Best Short Documentary Film - We Have One Heart by Katarzyna Warzecha

2019
 Grand Prix – Oleg by Juris Kursietis
 Special Jury Prize – Corpus Christi by Jan Komasa
 Critics' Prize - Corpus Christi by Jan Komasa
 Audience Award – Honeyland by Ljubomir Stefanov and Tamara Kotevska
 Audience Award for Best Short Fiction Film – The Christmas Gift by Bogdan Muresan
 Audience Award for Best Short Animated Film - Toomas Beneath The Valley Of The Wild Wolves by Chintis Lundgren
 Audience Award for Best Short Documentary Film - Dancing For You by Katarzyna Lesisz

2018
 Grand Prix – One Day by Zsófia Szilágyi
 Special Jury Prize – Winter Flies by Olmo Omerzu
 Critics' Prize – Ága by Milko Lazarov
 Special Mention – Ága by Milko Lazarov
 Audience Award – The Other Side Of Everything by Mila Turajlić
 Audience Award for Best Short Fiction Film – A Siege by István Kovács 
 Audience Award for Best Short Documentary Film – Vika by Marta Iwanek and Christian Borys
 Audience Award for Best Short Animated Film – The Box by Dušan Kastelic

2017
 Grand Prix – Birds Are Singing In Kigali by Joanna Kos-Krauze and Krzysztof Krauze
 Special Jury Prize – Soldiers. Story From Ferentari by Ivana Mladenović
 Critics' Prize – Directions by Stephan Komandarev
 Audience Award – The Constitution by Rajko Grlić
 Audience Award for Best Short Fiction Film – Into the Blue by Antoneta Alamat Kusijanović
 Audience Award for Best Short Documentary Film – Close Ties by Zofia Kowalewska
 Audience Award for Best Short Animated Film – Gamer Girl by Irena Jukić Pranjić

2016
 Grand Prix – Mellow Mud (Es Esmu Šeit) by Renars Vimba
 Special Jury Prize – Kills on Wheels by Atila Till
 Critics' Prize – 11 Minutes (film)  by  Jerzy Skolimowski
 Audience Award – Planet Single by Mitja Okorn
 Audience Award for Best Short Fiction Film - Romantik by Mateusz Rakowicz
 Audience Award for Best Short Documentary Film - Education by Emi Buchwald 
 Audience Award for Best Short Animated Film - Happy End by Jan Saska

2015
 Grand Prix – Body (2015 Polish film) by Małgorzata Szumowska
 Special Jury Prize – Babai (film) by Visar Morina
 Critics' Prize – Son of Saul  by  László Nemes
 Audience Award – Losers (2015 film) by Ivaylo Hristov
 Audience Award for Best Short Fiction Film - Shok (film) by Jamie Donoughue
 Audience Award for Best Short Documentary Film - 2nd floor / 2.em by Hajni Kis
 Audience Award for Best Short Animated Film - Nina by Veronika Obertová & Michaela Čopíková (Ové Pictures)

2014

 Grand Prix – The Way Out by Petr Václav
 Special Jury Prize – Viktoria by Maya Vitkova
 Audience Award – Life Feels Good by Maciej Pieprzyca
 Audience Award for Best Short Fiction Film - Little Secret by Martin Krejčí
 Audience Award for Best Short Documentary Film - Down On The Corner by Nikola & Corina Schwingruber Ilić
 Audience Award for Best Short Animated Film - Baths by Tomasz Ducki

2013

 Grand Prix – Circles by Srdan Golubovic
 Special Jury Prize – Heavenly Shift by Mark Bodzsar
 Audience Award – Circles by Srdan Golubovic

2012

 Grand Prix – Everybody In Our Family by Radu Jude
 Special Jury Prize – Tilva Rosh by Nikola Ležaić
 Audience Award – Mushrooming by Toomas Hussar
 Audience Award for best short feature – Frozen Stories by Grzegorz Jaroszuk

2011

 Grand Prix – The Mill and the Cross by Lech Majewski
 Special Jury Prize – Adrienn Pál by Ágnes Kocsis
 Audience Award – Czech Made Man by Tomáš Řehořek

2010

 Grand Prix – Morgen by Marian Crişan
 Audience Award  – Morgen by Marian Crişan

References

Cineuropa article about CinEast 2014 awards

Luxemburger Wort article about CinEast 2014

Cineuropa feature article - CinEast 2012 Awards

Film New Europe article

External links
Official website: www.cineast.lu / www.filmfestival.lu
 https://web.archive.org/web/20160304092736/http://filmcenter.cz/en/festivals-and-markets/detail/339-cineast
 http://cineuropa.org/2011/nw.aspx?t=newsdetail&l=en&did=210230

Film festivals in Europe
Festivals in Luxembourg